164589 La Sagra, provisional designation , is an asteroid of the Euterpe family from the inner regions of the asteroid belt, approximately  in diameter. It was discovered on 11 August 2007, by astronomers of the Astronomical Observatory of Mallorca at its robotic La Sagra Observatory in Grenada, Spain. It was named after Mount La Sagra and the discovering La Sagra Observatory.

Orbit and classification 

La Sagra is a member of the Euterpe family, a small family of stony asteroids named after its principal body, 27 Euterpe. It orbits the Sun in the inner asteroid belt at a distance of 1.9–3.0 AU once every 3 years and 10 months (1,395 days; semi-major axis of 2.44 AU). Its orbit has an eccentricity of 0.22 and an inclination of 1° with respect to the ecliptic. The body's observation arc begins with a precovery taken by Spacewatch in October 1992, nearly 15 years prior to its official discovery observation at La Sagra Observatory.

Naming 

This minor planet takes its name from the mountain La Sagra ("Sierra de La Sagra"; 2,382 meters above sea level), the highest mountain of the Prebetic mountain range, on whose north hillside the La Sagra Observatory is located. This asteroid was the observatory's first numbered discovery. The official  was published by the Minor Planet Center on 21 March 2008.

Physical characteristics 

Since Euterpe asteroids are of silicaceous rather than carbonaceous composition, with a relatively high albedo around 0.26 (also see list of families), La Sagra measures approximately 1.2 kilometer in diameter, based on an absolute magnitude of 16.6. As of 2018, no rotational lightcurve of La Sagra has been obtained from photometric observations. The body's rotation period, pole and shape remain unknown.

References

External links 
 Observatori Astronòmic de Mallorca
 Dictionary of Minor Planet Names, Google books
 Discovery Circumstances: Numbered Minor Planets (160001)-(165000) – Minor Planet Center
 
 

164589
164589
Named minor planets
20070811